Miss Earth Mauritius is a national Beauty pageant in Mauritius. The winner of Miss Earth Mauritius represents the country in the Miss Earth pageant, the third largest beauty festival in the world, where the goal is to promote environmental protection.

Titleholders

Representative at Miss Earth
Below are the special awards received by the winners of Miss Earth Mauritius and their final placements in the global beauty competition.
Color key

References

External links 
Miss Earth Indian Ocean official Facebook page

Mauritius
Beauty pageants in Mauritius